Geadly Salome (born 8 September 1984 in Groningen, Netherlands) is a Dutch footballer who played for Dutch Eerste Divisie club SC Veendam during the 2004-2008 seasons.

References

External links
voetbal international profile

1984 births
Living people
Dutch footballers
SC Veendam players
Eerste Divisie players
Footballers from Groningen (city)
Association footballers not categorized by position
21st-century Dutch people